One Voice is the sixth studio album by singer/songwriter Barry Manilow, released in 1979. It was recorded at United Western Studios and Allen Zentz Recording in Hollywood. The album peaked at #9 on the Billboard 200 chart and was certified double platinum by RIAA. The album contained three top-40 singles, "Ships" which peaked at #9, "When I Wanted You" at #20 and "I Don't Want to Walk Without You" which hit #36 on the Billboard Hot 100.

The title track was featured in a lengthy segment in an episode of the British comedy show Only Fools and Horses, "Fatal Extraction", where the show's central character Del Boy starts singing the song outside a block of flats late at night after he's been drinking, starting a riot.

The song "Who's Been Sleeping in My Bed?" was sampled in the song "Superheroes" by Daft Punk on the album Discovery.

Track listing
Music and lyrics written by Barry Manilow, except where noted.

Side one
"One Voice" - 3:01
"(Why Don't We Try) A Slow Dance" (lyrics: Bruce Sussman and Jack Feldman) - 4:16
"Rain" (lyrics: Adrienne Anderson) - 4:48
"Ships" (Ian Hunter) - 4:06
"You Could Show Me" (lyrics: Bruce Sussman and Jack Feldman) - 1:45
"I Don't Want to Walk Without You" (music: Jule Styne; lyrics: Frank Loesser) - 3:54

Side two
"Who's Been Sleeping in My Bed?" (lyrics: Marty Panzer) - 4:36
"Where Are They Now" (music: Richard Kerr; lyrics: John Bettis) - 3:59
"Bobbie Lee" (lyrics: Enoch Anderson)  - 3:32
"When I Wanted You" (Gino Cunico) - 3:31
"Sunday Father" (lyrics: Enoch Anderson) - 2:51

CD bonus tracks
"They Gave In to the Blues" (non-LP B-side of "Ships") (Included on 1998 and 2006 remasters) - 2:59
"Learning to Live Without You" (Demo - Included on 2006 remaster) - 3:46
"Where I Want to Be" (Demo - Included on 2006 remaster) - 2:57
"I Let Myself Believe" (Demo - Included on 2006 remaster) - 3:38

Personnel
Barry Manilow - vocals, backing vocals, piano
Mitch Holder - guitar
David Hungate, Dennis Belfield, Will Lee - bass
Bill Mays, Jai Winding - keyboards
Ian Underwood, Michael Boddicker - synthesizer 
Ed Greene, Jim Gordon - drums
Alan Estes - percussion
Jim Horn - saxophone on "Bobbie Lee"
Monica Burruss, Muffy Hendrix, Reparata, Ron Dante - backing vocals
Artie Butler, Jimmie Haskell - orchestration 
Technical
Michael DeLugg - engineer
Donn Davenport - art direction
Victor Skrebneski - photography

Charts

Certifications

References

One Voice
1979 albums
Arista Records albums
Albums produced by Ron Dante
Albums recorded at United Western Recorders